Boli Bolingoli-Mbombo (born 1 July 1995) is a Belgian professional footballer who plays as a left midfielder or defender for Belgian club Mechelen.

Career

Club Brugge
Bolingoli made his debut with Club Brugge on 26 July 2013 in the first game of the 2013–14 season against Sporting Charleroi replacing Maxime Lestienne in the 88th minute. Club Brugge won the game 2–0.

On 19 March 2015, he scored a brace against Beşiktaş in the UEFA Europa League round of 16, leading his team to qualify for the quarter-finals.

Celtic
On 3 July 2019, Bolingoli signed a four-year deal with Celtic.

On 19 September 2021, Bolingoli made his first competitive Celtic appearance back at the club following his loan spell at İstanbul Başakşehir, playing the full game against Livingston in a 1–0 defeat.

On 22 February 2022, Bolingoli was loaned to Russian Premier League club FC Ufa. On 1 April 2022, the loan was terminated early.

Mechelen
On 12 July 2022, Bolingoli joined Belgian First Division A club Mechelen on a permanent deal, signing a two-year deal and returning to Belgium after five years.

Personal life
His younger brother, Emeraude and his two cousins, Romelu and Jordan Lukaku are also footballers, as was his uncle Roger Lukaku. 

In August 2020, Bolingoli broke COVID-19 quarantine rules by making a trip to Spain, without notifying his club, before returning and playing against Kilmarnock on 9 August 2020. His actions caused First Minister, Nicola Sturgeon to call for the postponement of Celtic’s next two games. He received a three-match ban from the Scottish FA for his actions.

Bolingoli is eligible to play for DR Congo through his parents.

Career statistics

Honours
Club Brugge
 Belgian Cup: 2014–15
 Belgian First Division A: 2015–16
 Belgian Super Cup: 2016

Celtic
 Scottish Premiership: 2019–20, 2021–22
 Scottish League Cup: 2019–20

References

External links

1995 births
Living people
Footballers from Antwerp
Association football wingers
Association football fullbacks
Belgian footballers
Club Brugge KV players
Sint-Truidense V.V. players
SK Rapid Wien players
Celtic F.C. players
İstanbul Başakşehir F.K. players
FC Ufa players
Belgian Pro League players
Austrian Football Bundesliga players
Scottish Professional Football League players
Süper Lig players
Belgian sportspeople of Democratic Republic of the Congo descent
Belgian expatriate sportspeople in Scotland
Expatriate footballers in Scotland
Belgian expatriate sportspeople in Austria
Expatriate footballers in Austria
Belgian expatriate sportspeople in Turkey
Expatriate footballers in Turkey
Belgian expatriate sportspeople in Russia
Expatriate footballers in Russia